The Fieseler Fi 5 (previously F5) was a single-engined two-seat sportplane of the 1930s. It was produced by the German aircraft manufacturer Fieseler Flugzeugbau, which was started by the World War I fighter ace and German aerobatic star, Gerhard Fieseler.

Design and development
Gerhard worked at the company full-time after winning the first World Aeronautics Competition (Championship) of 1934 in his Fieseler F2 Tiger, having previously won the 1932 European Aerobatic Championship, and the F5 was among the company's earliest big sellers. The F5 was powered by the Hirth HM 60 engine. It competed with the Klemm Kl 25, but with the F5's shorter wings and different handling that experienced pilots preferred, it became quite popular.

The F 5 was a low-wing tandem two-seat monoplane which retained the fabric-covered steel-tube fuselage of the earlier Fieseler F 4 but introduced a new two-spar cantilever wing. It had a fixed conventional landing gear with a tail-skid and the tandem open-cockpit were fitted with dual-controls. Behind the rear seat was a large luggage locker, the top decking at the rear could be removed to carry a spare propeller or skis.

In 1935 one aircraft Saureland was modified as a single-seat aerobatic aircraft for Lise Fastenrath with the front cockpit covered over. Only one aircraft survived the Second World War, it was later fitted with an enclosed cabin but was written off in France in 1968.

Variants
F 5
Production aircraft with a Hirth HM.60 engine.
F 5R
Aircraft fitted with an uprated Hirth HM.60R engine.

Specifications (F.5R)

See also

References

Notes

Bibliography
 "The "Fiesler 5" Monoplane". Flight, 2 November 1933, p. 1100.

F005
Single-engined tractor aircraft
1930s German sport aircraft
Low-wing aircraft
Aerobatic aircraft
Aircraft first flown in 1933